Madouri is a small uninhabited island in the Ionian Sea, near Lefkada, Greece. It is part of the municipal unit Ellomenos. Madouri lies 700 m from the east coast of the island Lefkada, opposite the town Nydri. The island is heavily forested.
 
This privately owned island is in the possession of the Valaoritis family. It was the place where Aristotelis Valaoritis, a 19th-century poet, grew up. The current owner is the writer Nanos Valaoritis.  The villa was the principal location in Billy Wilder's 1978 film, Fedora.

External links
Madouri on GTP Travel Pages (in English and Greek)

References

Islands of the Ionian Islands (region)
Islands of Greece
Landforms of Lefkada (regional unit)
Uninhabited islands of Greece
Populated places in Lefkada (regional unit)
Private islands of Greece